Aziz Ouakaa (born 7 August 1999) is a Tunisian tennis player.

Ouakaa has a career-high ATP singles ranking of 756, achieved on 11 January 2021. He also has a career high ATP doubles ranking of 359, which was achieved on 3 October 2022. Ouakaa has won eight ITF doubles title.

Ouakaa has represented Tunisia at the Davis Cup, where he has a win–loss record of 8–1.

World Tennis Tour and Challenger finals

Doubles: 12 (8–4)

Davis Cup

Participations: (6–0)

   indicates the outcome of the Davis Cup match followed by the score, date, place of event, the zonal classification and its phase, and the court surface.

External links
 
 
 

1999 births
Living people
Tunisian male tennis players
21st-century Tunisian people